Prodesmodon is an extinct genus of prehistoric salamander, first described from the Lance Formation.

See also 
 List of prehistoric amphibian genera

References 

Cretaceous salamanders
Cretaceous amphibians of North America
Prehistoric amphibian genera
Cretaceous United States
Hell Creek fauna
Lance fauna
Cretaceous–Paleogene boundary
Fossil taxa described in 1964